The Woods End Road Historic District is a residential historic district at 68 Baker Bridge Rd., 1, 5, 9, and 10 Woods End Road in Lincoln, Massachusetts.  The district consists of five houses, one of which is Colonial Revival in style, and the other four are in International Style.  Helen Storrow, a wealthy philanthropist who owned the land, also funded the construction of the houses, which were among the earliest of their style to be built in the United States.

All four of the International houses were designed by internationally renowned architects, and three of those served as the architect's own residence.  The most well known of these is the Gropius House at 68 Baker Bridge Road, a National Historic Landmark and house museum owned by Historic New England, which was designed by Bauhaus architect Walter Gropius as his personal residence.  Two other houses on Woods End Road were also designed by Gropius and his friend Marcel Breuer.  Breuer also designed one of the houses on Woods End Road as his personal residence, as did Walter Bogner.

The district was listed on the National Register of Historic Places in 1988.

Houses

See also
National Register of Historic Places listings in Middlesex County, Massachusetts

References

External links

Historic districts in Middlesex County, Massachusetts
Lincoln, Massachusetts
National Register of Historic Places in Middlesex County, Massachusetts
Historic districts on the National Register of Historic Places in Massachusetts